Qasemabad-e Eskander Beyk (also Romanized as Qāsemābād-e Esḵander Beyḵ; also known as Qāsemābād) is a village in Behnamvasat-e Jonubi Rural District, Javadabad District, Varamin County, Tehran Province, Iran. At the 2006 census, its population was 11, in 4 families.

References 

Populated places in Varamin County